This is a list of the complete squads for the 2017 Six Nations Championship, an annual rugby union tournament contested by the national rugby teams of England, France, Ireland, Italy, Scotland and Wales. England are the defending champions.

Note: Number of caps and players' ages are indicated as of 4 February 2017 – the tournament's opening day.

England
On 20 January, head coach Eddie Jones named a 35-man squad.

Head coach:  Eddie Jones

Call-ups
On 20 February, Mako Vunipola returned to the squad following injury while Henry Slade was an addition to the team ahead of Italy.

On 28 February, Paul Hill was an addition to the training squad during the week off between Rounds 3 and 4.

On 7 March, Billy Vunipola returned to the squad following injury.

France
On 18 January 2017, Novès called up a 32-man squad in preparation for the tournament.

Head coach:  Guy Novès

Call-ups
On 22 January, Henry Chavancy was called up to the squad as an injury replacement for Wesley Fofana.

On 23 January, Mathieu Bastareaud and Xavier Chiocci were called up as injury cover following injuries to Henry Chavancy and Eddy Ben Arous.

On 24 January, Christopher Tolofua was called up to the squad as an injury replacement for Camille Chat. Raphaël Lakafia also withdrew from the squad but was not replaced.

On 5 February, Gabriel Lacroix was called up to the squad to replace the injured Yann David.

On 20 February, Brice Dulin, Paul Jedrasiak, Bernard Le Roux and Charles Ollivon were called up to the squad.

On 5 March, Jonathan Danty and François Trinh-Duc were called up to the squad ahead of the round 4 clash with Italy.

On 9 March, Antoine Dupont was a late call up to the squad following an injury to Maxime Machenaud in training.

Ireland
On 23 January 2017, Joe Schmidt named a 40-man squad for the opening two rounds of the championship.

Head coach:  Joe Schmidt

Call-ups
On 31 January, Ian Keatley was called up to the squad as injury cover for Johnny Sexton who was ruled out of the opening round of the Championship.

On 19 February, Quinn Roux was named in an extended squad ahead of the third round clash against France.

Italy
On 13 January 2017, head coach Conor O'Shea named a 32-man squad.

Head coach:  Conor O'Shea

Call-ups
On 22 February, Michele Rizzo was named in the team to face England in round 3.

On 1 March, uncapped duo Luca Sperandio and Matteo Minozzi were called up to the squad, with Minozzi providing cover for Tommaso Allan.

Scotland
On 18 January, Vern Cotter named a 37-man squad ahead of the tournament.

Head coach:  Vern Cotter

Wales
On 17 January 2017, caretaker head coach Rob Howley named a 36-man squad.

Head coach:  Rob Howley (caretaker)

References

squads
2017 Squads